The 2012–13 UAFA Club Cup qualifying rounds was played from 11 September to 5 December 2012. A total of 22 teams from Africa and Asia zones competed in the qualifying rounds to decide the 8 places in the knock-out stage of the 2012–13 UAFA Club Cup.

Teams
The following 22 teams (10 from African Zone and 12 from Asian Zone) entered the qualifying rounds, which consisted of two rounds (first Round and second Round):
Eleven teams (3 from African Zone, 8 from Asian Zone) entered in first Round.
Eleven teams (7 from African Zone, 4 from Asian Zone) entered in second Round.

Format
Qualification ties were decided over two legs, with aggregate goals used to determine the winner. If the sides were level on aggregate after the second leg, the away goals rule was applied, and if still level, the tie proceeded to a penalty shootout after extra time was played.

Schedule
The schedule of each round was as follows.

First round
The draw was made in June 2012.

African zone
Three teams play a tournament matches as a championship in Moroni, Comoros. Only one team qualify to the next round.

Asian zone

|}

Notes

Shaab Ibb advanced on the away goal rule after drawing 3–3 on aggregate.

Shabab Al-Dhahiriya won 3–1 on aggregate.

Al-Fateh won 3–1 on aggregate.

Al-Hidd advanced on the away goal rule after drawing 1–1 on aggregate.

Second round
The draw was held in Amman, Jordan on 29 September.

|-
!colspan=5|Africa zone

|-
!colspan=5|Asia zone

|}

Notes

African zone

USM Alger won 4–1 on aggregate.

CR Belouizdad won 5–4 on aggregate.

Raja Casablanca won 4–2 on aggregate.

Ismaily SC won 6–3 on aggregate.

Asian zone

Al-Quwa Al-Jawiya won 4–0 on aggregate

Al-Baqa'a won 3–1 on aggregate

Al-Arabi won 5–4 on aggregate

Al-Nassr won 5–0 on aggregate

References

2012–13 UAFA Club Cup